The following is a list of industries, intended as an overview and a topical guide to different types of industries

Industry, in economics and economic geography, refers to the production of an economic good or service within an economy.

Essence of industry 
 Business
 Cottage Industry
 Heavy industry
 Light industry
 Manufacturing
In some cases, industries can be harmful, such as those where harmful waste chemicals are dumped in bodies of water, or even those where pesticides and similar inadvertently leak into water sources.

Industry sectors 

 Primary sector of the economy (the raw materials industry)
 Secondary sector of the economy (manufacturing and construction)
 Tertiary sector of the economy (the "service industry")
 Quaternary sector of the economy (information services)
 Quinary sector of the economy (human services)

Major industries

Agriculture

 Fishing industry
 Horticulture industry
 Tobacco industry
 Wood industry

Manufacturing

Aerospace industry
Automotive industry 
Chemical industry
Pharmaceutical industry
Construction industry
Defense industry
Arms industry
Electric power industry
Electronics industry 
Computer industry
Semiconductor industry
Energy industry
Food industry
Industrial robot industry
Low technology industry
Meat
 Meat packing
Mining
Petroleum industry
 Oil shale
Pulp and paper industry
Steel industry
Shipbuilding industry
Telecommunications industry
Textile industry
Water industry

Services

 Creative
 Advertising
 Fashion
 Floral
 Cultural industry
 Culture industry
 Education industry
 Entertainment industry
 Film industry
 Gambling industry
 Music industry
 Sex industry
 Video game industry
 Financial services industry
 Insurance industry
 Healthcare industry
 Hospitality industry
 Information industry
 Leisure industry
 Mass media
 Broadcasting
 Internet
 News media
 Publishing
 Entertainment
 Professional services
 Real estate industry
 Retail industry
 Software industry
 Sport industry
 Transport industry

History of industry 
 Industrial history
 Industrial Revolution
 Second Industrial Revolution
 Third Industrial Revolution
 Fourth Industrial Revolution

General industrial concepts  
 Air pollution
 Big business
 Colin Clark's Sector Model
 Economies of scale
 Employment tribunal
 Externality
 Global Industry Classification Standard
 Industrial action
 Industrial Age
 Industrial and organizational psychology
 Industrial and production engineering
 Industrial applicability
 Industrial archaeology
 Industrial coating
 Industrial control system
 Industrial data processing
 Industrial deconcentration
 Industrial democracy
 Industrial design
 Industrial design right
 Industrial disasters
 Industrial district
 Industrial ecology
 Industrial symbiosis
 Industrial engineering
 Industrial espionage
 Industrial gas
 Industrial internet of things
 Industrial mineral
 Industrial organization
 Industrial park
 Industrial PC
 Industrial policy
 Industrial processes
 Industrial production index
 Industrial railway
 Industrial society
 Post-industrial society
 Pre-industrial society
 Industrial sociology
 Industrial unionism
 Industrial waste
 Industrialist
 Industrialization
 Industry analyst
 Industry Structure Model
 Labor revolt
 Machine tooling
 Machining
 Market research
 Mass production
 Materials science
 Occupational injury
 Occupational noise
 Pricing
 Raw material
 Robber baron (industrialist)
 Science park
 Seven Wonders of the Industrial World
 Standard Industrial Classification
 Trade association

Industrial output 
 Input–output model
 List of countries by GDP sector composition

See also 
 Capitalism
 List of research parks
 List of technology centers

References

External links 

Industry
Industry
 
Industry-related lists

mk:Преглед на индустријата